Lebedinoye is inhabited locality (a selo) in Khasansky District, Primorsky Krai in the Russian Far East, close to the border with North Korea. The settlement was established in 1958 close to the Lebedinoye Lake next to the Lebediny train halt ( which was opened in 1952. The lake is connected to the Ekspeditsii Bay through the Lebediny Bay. The settlement is connected with a 2 km road to the Khasan-Razdolnoye Road A189. In 2016 the settlement was removed from the Russian border zone.

References

Rural localities in Primorsky Krai

ru:Лебединое (Хасанский район)